Len Stott (16 November 1909 – 7 May 2000) was  a former Australian rules footballer who played with Fitzroy in the Victorian Football League (VFL).

Notes

External links 
		

1909 births
2000 deaths
Australian rules footballers from Victoria (Australia)
Fitzroy Football Club players
Preston Football Club (VFA) players